Wargnies is a commune in the Somme department in Hauts-de-France in northern France.

Geography
Wargnies is situated 10 miles(16 km) north of Amiens, on the D60 road.

Population

See also
Communes of the Somme department

References

Communes of Somme (department)